Wenchi crater lake, also spelled as Wancii or Wonchi,  is a volcano located  west of Addis Ababa, in Oromia Region, Ethiopia. Wonchi is located at equal distance between the towns of Ambo and Woliso.

Features

Besides Wonchi lake, the caldera also contains hot springs, waterfalls, valleys, and other scenery. There are two islands in the lake. On one of the islands there is an ancient church called Cherkos monastery. One can reach the islands and the monastery by ferry. Due to its unique topography, Wanchi is blessed with varieties of animal and plant species. For these reasons, Wanchi has become a popular tourist destination in Ethiopia. This has been the case even though there was no dry weather road. Since the construction of Ambo-Waliso gravel road, tourism has emerged as one of the rapidly growing economic sectors in the district, Wanchi lake becoming a favored weekend destination for residents of nearby cities including Addis Ababa. The tourist can hire horses to take down the mountain to the lake. It takes about one hour from the volcano rim to reach the lake side.

References

Wonchi
Wonchi